Kolontayevka is a rural locality (a settlement) in Gustomoysky Selsoviet Rural Settlement, Lgovsky District, Kursk Oblast, Russia. Population:

Geography 
The settlement is located 37 km from the Russia–Ukraine border, 76 km south-west of Kursk, 12 km south-west of the district center – the town Lgov, 8 km from the selsoviet center – Gustomoy.

 Climate
Kolontayevka has a warm-summer humid continental climate (Dfb in the Köppen climate classification).

Transport 
Kolontayevka is located 7 km from the road of regional importance  (Kursk – Lgov – Rylsk – border with Ukraine) as part of the European route E38, on the road of intermunicipal significance  (Ivanovskoye – Kolontayevka). There is a railway halt Kolontayevka (railway line 322 km – Lgov I).

The rural locality is situated 83 km from Kursk Vostochny Airport, 143 km from Belgorod International Airport and 285 km from Voronezh Peter the Great Airport.

References

Notes

Sources

Rural localities in Lgovsky District